Blinded Black is a five-piece post-hardcore band from St. Louis, Missouri. After forming in 1999 as a six-piece, the group self-released their debut album and began touring both locally and around the Midwest. The group signed with SideCho Records and began working with producer Marc McClusky. Their latest album, Under the Sunrise, was released February 27, 2007 on SideCho Records; following its release the band toured with LoveHateHero and Vanna.

Blinded Black called it quits in March 2008. The band had a small farewell tour in Indiana and Missouri from May 16–30, with their last show being in Missouri on May 30, 2008. Since then, the members of Blinded Black have joined other bands. They reunited on May 2, 2009, for a reunion show in Evansville, Indiana. They also reunited for a show on February 25, 2011 at Pops in Sauget, Illinois, supported by Last Nights Vice, Wild Tiger, Breakdances With Wolves, Gateway Getaway, and Clayton Jones Band.

On January 4, 2017, Blinded Black announced that they have reunited after a "decade of silence", and the following month the band announced the release of their new single titled "The Next Chapter," which is due to released on March 3, 2017.

Members
Jeff Nizick – lead vocals
Mike Smith – guitar
Nick Rohlmann – guitar
Tyler Hanks – bass guitar, unclean vocals
Jake Rohlmann – drums, percussion

Former members
Chuck Kraus – keyboards, synthesizers, backing vocals

Discography

Albums

Songs on Compilations
Under the Sunrise – Warped Tour 2007 Tour Compilation
Set in Stone – Automaton Transfusion Soundtrack

References

External links
 Blinded Black on Myspace

American post-hardcore musical groups
Musical groups from St. Louis